Modotuximab (INN; formerly zatuximab) is a chimeric monoclonal antibody designed for the treatment of cancer. It acts as an immunomodulator and binds to HER1.

References 

Monoclonal antibodies for tumors